József Tempfli (April 9, 1931 – May 25, 2016) was a Romanian Roman Catholic bishop. He was born into an ethnic Hungarian family. Ordained to the priesthood in 1962, Tempfli served as bishop of the Roman Catholic Diocese of Oradea Mare from 1990 until 2008.

Notes

1931 births
2016 deaths
People from Satu Mare County
21st-century Roman Catholic bishops in Romania
Romanian religious leaders of Hungarian descent